Piange... il telefono is a 1975 Italian romance-drama film directed by Lucio De Caro. Its plot is based on the lyrics of the eponymous hit song of Domenico Modugno.

Cast

Domenico Modugno: Andrea Balestrieri	
Francesca Guadagno: Chiara	
Marie Yvonne Danaud: Colette Vincent
Louis Jourdan: Alberto Landi 	
Claudio Lippi: copilot
Gigi Ballista

References

External links

1975 films
Italian romantic drama films
1975 romantic drama films
Films based on songs
Films directed by Lucio De Caro
1970s Italian films